Ministry of Revenue may refer to:

 Ministry of Revenue of imperial China, a former national ministry in China, later replaced by the ROC and PRC's Ministries of Finance
 Ministry of Revenue of Ontario, a provincial ministry in Canada
 Ministry of Revenue of Quebec, a former provincial ministry in Canada, now known by its French name Revenu Québec

See also
 Ministry of Finance
 Treasury
 Exchequer
 Ministry of Revenues and Duties, a former Ukrainian ministry